Kiril Vasilev Despodov (born 11 November 1996) is a Bulgarian professional footballer who plays for Ludogorets Razgrad and the Bulgaria national team. He primarily plays as a winger but can also play as a forward.

Despodov made his way through the youth teams at Litex Lovech before making his senior debut in 2012 at the age of 15. He became part of CSKA Sofia in June 2016, where he established himself as the team's star player, winning the Bulgarian Footballer of the Year award in 2018 – the first CSKA player to do so since Hristo Stoichkov in 1989. He won it for second time in 2021.

On 23 March 2018, Despodov made his senior international debut for Bulgaria in a 1–0 friendly loss against Bosnia and Herzegovina.

Career

Litex Lovech
Despodov was born in Kresna. He joined Litex Lovech's Academy at the age of 12 and progressed through the club's youth system. He played an important role in Litex's 2012 BFU U-16 Cup win, scoring two goals in the final against Cherno More on 26 April.

Despodov made his first team debut under Hristo Stoichkov's management, at 15 years 183 days, in a 5–0 league win over Kaliakra Kavarna on 12 May 2012, coming on as a substitute for Svetoslav Todorov. He scored his first goal on 10 August 2013, netting the fifth in a 5–1 away league win over Pirin Gotse Delchev.

On 22 November 2014, Despodov scored his first goal of the 2014–15 season against Cherno More in a 3–0 away win. On 27 November, he signed his first professional contract with Litex shortly after turning 18. Two days later he scored his second goal of the season in a 2–2 away draw against Levski Sofia in the 66th minute to clinch a point for his team.

Despite the not so good start of the season 2015–16 for Despodov, as he played only in 4 matches from 19 rounds, he became a hero in the quarterfinals of the Bulgarian Cup. In the match against Levski Sofia, after coming on as a substitute in the 76th minute when the match was 0–0 and Litex was down to 10 people, they eventually ended up winning the game after extra time 3–0, with Despodov scoring 2 of the goals.

CSKA Sofia
He joined CSKA Sofia in the summer of 2016. On 29 April 2017, Despodov scored his first goal in The Eternal Derby, netting the second in CSKA Sofia's 3–0 win over Levski Sofia in a First Professional Football League match. Remaining with the club until January 2019 and becoming popular with the fans of the "redmen", Despodov later began receiving a frosty reception from them as a result of becoming part of the ranks of league rivals Ludogorets Razgrad in 2020.

Cagliari
On 30 January 2019, Despodov completed a transfer to Serie A side Cagliari, signing a contract until 2023 with an extension option for one more season. CSKA Sofia did not reveal the exact transfer fee, but it was reported that it broke the record for an outgoing First League transfer of a local Bulgarian player, which until then was Hristo Stoichkov's $ 4.5 million move to Barcelona in the summer of 1990. He made his debut for the club in a 3–0 away loss to Milan on 10 February, coming on for Artur Ioniță in the 75th minute.

Sturm Graz (loan)
On 2 September 2019, Despodov was loaned to Sturm Graz for the 2019–20 season.

Ludogorets Razgrad 
On 5 October 2020, Cagliari announced that Despodov would be loaned to Ludogorets Razgrad with an option to buy. The deal would see him remain at the club for the duration of the 2020–21 campaign.

On 19 June 2021, Ludogorets announced that he had signed permanently with the club. On 12 March 2023, Despodov scored his first hat-trick for Ludogorets in a 3–2 home win over Cherno More in a league match.

International career
On 7 February 2015, Despodov made his first appearance for Bulgaria, in a goalless draw with Romania in a non-official friendly match, coming on as a late substitute for Stanislav Manolev. He was also called up in March 2017, for a 2018 World Cup qualifier against the Netherlands, but remained on the bench. Despodov finally made his complete debut for Bulgaria on 23 March 2018 in a friendly match against Bosnia and Herzegovina, replacing Spas Delev shortly after the one hour mark.

On 13 October 2018, he scored his first goal for the national team in a 2–1 home win against Cyprus, in a match for the 2018–19 UEFA Nations League. His second goal came in a 2022 FIFA World Cup qualification against Switzerland national football team. On 29 March 2022, Despodov opened the scoring in the friendly match against Croatia, but was dismissed from the field almost immediately after that due to receiving a second yellow card for taking off his shirt as part of his goal celebration.

Personal life 
On 17 August 2020, Despodov tested positive for covid-19.

Career statistics

Club

International

International goals
Scores and results list Bulgaria's goal tally first.

Honours

Club
Ludogorets Razgrad
Bulgarian First League: 2020–21, 2021–22
Bulgarian Supercup: 2021, 2022

Individual
 Bulgarian Youth Footballer of the Year: 2017
 Bulgarian Footballer of the Year: 2018, 2021, 2022

References

External links

Living people
1996 births
People from Kresna
Bulgarian footballers
Bulgaria international footballers
Bulgaria youth international footballers
Bulgaria under-21 international footballers
Association football forwards
First Professional Football League (Bulgaria) players
Second Professional Football League (Bulgaria) players
PFC Litex Lovech players
PFC CSKA Sofia players
Cagliari Calcio players
SK Sturm Graz players
PFC Ludogorets Razgrad players
Serie A players
Austrian Football Bundesliga players
Bulgarian expatriate footballers
Expatriate footballers in Italy
Expatriate footballers in Austria
Sportspeople from Blagoevgrad Province